The Reina Nacional de Belleza Miss Internacional República Dominicana 2008 pageant will be held on October 17, 2007. This year only 28 candidates are competing for the national crown. The chosen winner will represent the Dominican Republic at the Miss International 2008 and other small international pageant which was held in Macau.

Results

Special awards
 Miss Photogenic (voted by press reporters) - Obelíz Antigua (Duarte)
 Miss Congeniality (voted by contestants) - Melany Batista (La Altagracia)
 Best Face - Claudia Peña (Monseñor Nouel)
 Best Provincial Costume - Rosiell Polanco (Monte Cristi)
 Best Hair - Eva Gazo (Azua)
 Miss Elegancia - Laura Rosal (Valverde)
 Best eyes - Claudia Peña (Monseñor Nouel)

Delegates

Trivia

Melanie Batista, Miss La Altagracia entered in Miss RD Universo '05
Miss Monseñor Nouel would enter in Miss RD Universo '07 and would withdraw due to college.
Rocio Castellanos, Miss Santiago would enter in Miss Dominican Republic Universe 2009 and would be the 2nd runner up.

External links
Official Website
Reina Nacional de Belleza Miss República Dominicana 2007/2008 pageant videos
http://foro.univision.com/univision/board/message?board.id=missrepublicadominicana&message.id=8536
http://foro.univision.com/univision/board/message?board.id=missrepublicadominicana&message.id=8983

Miss Dominican Republic
2008 beauty pageants
2008 in the Dominican Republic